Hawes County is one of the 141 Cadastral divisions of New South Wales. It is bounded on the south by the Manning River.

Hawes County was named in honour of Sir Benjamin Hawes (1797–1862).

Parishes within this county
A full list of parishes found within this county; their current LGA and mapping coordinates to the approximate centre of each location is as follows:

References

Counties of New South Wales